Eugene Delbert Greene (June 9, 1877 – April 5, 1930) was an American vaudeville and ragtime singer. He was one of the first to use scat singing techniques.

Career
Greene was born in Indiana. He worked with his wife, Blanche Werner, as Greene & Werner.

Between 1911 and 1917, he made five recordings of "King of the Bungaloos", which was his most popular song. Nicknamed "The Ragtime King", he employed scat singing techniques on this song. His other songs included "The Chinese Blues" and "Alexander's Got a Jazz Band Now". While on a tour of Europe in 1912, Blanche Werner died. Greene continued to perform, making about 64 recordings during 1912–13 before returning to the U.S. He retired to Grand Rapids, Michigan, and ran a restaurant. He tried to sing again in New York City but died of a heart attack backstage.

"King of the Bungaloos" appeared on Pop Music: The Early Years 1890–1950 as part of Sony's Soundtrack for a Century box set.

See also
List of ragtime composers

References

1877 births
1930 deaths
American male composers
20th-century American composers
Ragtime composers
Vaudeville performers
People from Aurora, Illinois
Scat singers
20th-century American singers
20th-century American male singers
American male jazz musicians